This is an incomplete list of public administration and public policy schools, colleges and faculties; divided by country.

International
European Institute of Public Administration
Monterey Institute of International Studies at Middlebury College
Higher Institute For Professional Development And Training (HIPDET)
SADAT Academy for public administration -EGYPT-
School of Global Affairs and Public Policy (GAPP) at American University in Cairo (AUC),  Egypt.

Australia

Australian Capital Territory
 Institute for Governance and Policy Analysis (IGPA) at the University of Canberra
Crawford School of Public Policy at The Australian National University

New South Wales
Master of Public Policy at the University of Sydney
Master of Public Administration at the University of Sydney
Master of Politics and Public Policy at Macquarie University

Queensland
Department of Politics and Public Policy at Griffith University
Master of Governance and Public Policy at the University of Queensland

South Australia
Flinders Institute of Public Policy and Management at Flinders University

Victoria
Faculty of Business and Economics at Monash University
Melbourne School of Government at Melbourne University

Western Australia
Sir Walter Murdoch School of Public Policy and International Affairs at Murdoch University

Tasmania
Master of Public Policy at University of Tasmania

Canada

Alberta
School of Public Policy at the University of Calgary

British Columbia
School of Public Policy at the Simon Fraser University
School of Public Administration at the University of Victoria
School of Public Policy and Global Affairs at the University of British Columbia

Manitoba
Faculty of Arts: Political Science,  at the University of Manitoba

New Brunswick
Maîtrise en administration publique (MPA) at Université de Moncton

Nova Scotia
School of Public Administration at Dalhousie University

Ontario
School of Public Policy and Administration at Carleton University
School of Policy Studies at Queen's University at Kingston
Master of Public Administration (MPA) at the Royal Military College of Canada
Master of Arts in Public Policy and Administration at Toronto Metropolitan University
MA Public Policy and Administration, Department of Political Science at the University of Guelph
Graduate School of Public and International Affairs at the University of Ottawa
Munk School of Global Affairs and Public Policy at the University of Toronto
Master of Public Service, Dean of Arts at the University of Waterloo
Local Government Program (MPA & DPA) at University of Western Ontario
School of Public Policy and Administration at York University
School of Public and International Affairs at the Glendon College York University

Quebec
Master in Public Policy and Public Administration (MPPPA), at Concordia University
Master of Public Affairs (MPA), at Université Laval
Master of Public Policy (MPP), Max Bell School of Public Policy, at McGill University
Department of Political Science at Université de Montréal
Master of Public Administration (MPA), at École nationale d'administration publique, Université du Québec
Master in Administration, Concentration Public Management at Université de Sherbrooke

Saskatchewan
Johnson Shoyama Graduate School of Public Policy at the University of Regina and University of Saskatchewan

Brazil
Universidade Estadual Paulista "Júlio de Mesquita Filho" (UNESP)

Administração Pública - Faculdade de Ciências e Letras de Araraquara

Fundação Escola Nacional de Administração Pública (Enap)
 Políticas públicas, gestão e administração pública

Fundação Getúlio Vargas (FGV)
 Escola Brasileira de Administração Pública e de Empresas (EBAPE, Brazilian School of Public and Business Administration)
 Escola de Pós-Graduação em Economia (EPGE, Graduate School of Economics)

Universidade de Brasília
 Gestão de Políticas Públicas
Universidade Estadual Paulista "Júlio de Mesquita Filho" (UNESP) de Araraquara: Graduação em Administração Pública

Sciences Center of Administration and Socioeconomic ESAG, State University of Santa Catarina UDESC

Chile
Institute of Public Affairs of the University of Chile
Faculty of Politics and Government, Central University of Chile
Departamento of Public Policy and Management, University of Santiago of Chile
School of Government, Pontifical Catholic University of Chile

China
China National School of Administration
Tsinghua University
Peking University
Shanghai Jiao Tong University
Fudan University
Nanjing University

Colombia
Escuela Superior de Administración Pública

Costa Rica
Escuela de Administración Pública, Universidad de Costa Rica

Finland
Master of Administrative Sciences at University of Lapland
Master of Administrative Sciences at University of Tampere
Master of Administrative Sciences at University of Vaasa

France
 School of Public Affairs, Sciences Po
Institut National des Etudes Territoriales
École nationale d'administration

Germany
Hertie School of Governance, Berlin
Willy Brandt School of Public Policy, Erfurt
German University of Administrative Sciences Speyer, Speyer
University of Konstanz, Konstanz

Greece
National Centre for Public Administration & Local Government (EKDDA)
Panteion University Department of Public Administration

Hong Kong
Department of Politics and Public Administration, Faculty of Social Science, The University of Hong Kong - Master of Public Administration (MPA)
Faculty of Social Sciences and School of Business, Hong Kong Baptist University - Master of Public Administration (MPA)

Hungary
Faculty of Political Sciences and Public Administration, National University of Public Service, Budapest 
School of Public Policy, Central European University, Budapest - Master of Public Administration (MPA)

India
Department of Public Administration, Assam Don Bosco University, Sonapur, Assam
Department of Public Administration, Jamia Milia Islamia, New Delhi
 Department of Public Administration, Kurukshetra University Kurukshetra, Haryana 
Department of public administration, Rajasthan University, Jaipur
Department of Public Administration, Osmania University, Hyderabad
Department of Public Administration, Panjab University, Chandigarh
Department of Public Administration, University of Lucknow
Indian School of Business, Hyderabad
Department of Local Governance, Rajiv Gandhi National Institute of Youth Development, Sriperumbudur, Tamil Nadu
Indian Institute of Public Administration, New Delhi
Madras Christian College (Autonomous), Chennai
Lal Bahadur Shastri National Academy of Administration
Division of Public Administration, Department of Political Science, Aligarh Muslim University, Aligarh
Amity Institute Of Public Policy, Amity University Noida.
The Hindu Centre for Public Policy
Tata Institute of Social Sciences, Hyderabad - Master of Arts in Public Policy and Governance (MA PPG)
St. Xaviers College(Autonomous), Mumbai
National Law School of India University, Bangalore - Master of Public Policy (MPP)
Jindal School of Government and Public Policy, New Delhi
Indian Institute of Management, Bangalore - PGPPM, Centre for public Policy (CPP)
Management Development Institute - School Of Public Policy And Governance
N.S. Patel Arts College, Anand, Gujarat
The Takshashila Institution The Takshashila Institution, an independent think tank and a school of public policy.
Department of Public Administration, Punjabi University, Patiala, Punjab
Andhra University, Visakhapatnam
Sri Sri University, Cuttack
Department of Politics and Public Administration, University Of Madras, Chennai
Department of Public Administration, Mizoram University, Aizawl
 Department of Public Administration, Dr. Babasaheb Ambedkar Marathwada University, Aurangabad, Maharashtra
 Department of Public Administration, Magadh University, BodhGaya, Bihar
 Department of Public Administration, Central University, Kerala
 Department of Public Administration, School of Social Science, Indira Gandhi National Open University

Indonesia
Faculty of administrative sciences in University of Indonesia
Faculty of administrative sciences in University of Brawijaya
The School of Government and Public Policy

Ireland
Institute of Public Administration
Public Affairs Ireland

Israel
University of Haifa Public Management and Policy Program

Italy
 Bocconi University
 SNA - Scuola Nazionale dell'Amministrazione 
 Luiss School of Government at Libera Università Internazionale degli Studi Sociali Guido Carli, Rome

Japan
National Graduate Institute for Policy Studies, Tokyo
Graduate School of Public Policy, University of Tokyo, Tokyo
Faculty of Public Management, Keio University, Kanagawa

Kazakhstan
Kazakhstan Institute of Management, Economics and Strategic Research

Kenya
University of Nairobi, Kenya School of Government 
Moi University 
Kenyatta University 
Mount Kenya University

Korea, South
National HRD Institute, Ministry of Personnel Management
Seoul National University Graduate School of Public Administration
Korea University Graduated School of Public Administration
Yonsei University Graduated School of Public Administration
Hanyang University Greaduated School of Public Administration
KDI School of Public Policy and Management

Mexico
UNAM - Universidad Nacional Autonoma de Mexico
Universidad Panamericana
INAP - Instituto Nacional de Administración Pública
TIC - Tecnológico Iberoamericano Coyoacán

Nepal

Kathmandu
Central Department of Public Administration (CDPA)
Public Administration Campus (PAC)

Biratnagar
 Mahendra Morang Multiple Campus (MMC)

Netherlands
Maastricht Graduate School of Governance
Master Public Administration, Erasmus University Rotterdam
Leiden University

Malaysia
Faculty of Administrative Science and Policy Studies, UiTM Shah Alam
 Master of Public Policy, International Institute of Public Policy & Management, University Malaya
 Master of Public Administration (MPA), Universiti Sains Malaysia

Pakistan
 Department Of Public Administration Government College University Faisalabad
PIDE School of Public Policy, Pakistan Institute of Development Economics, Islamabad.
Department of Government & Public Policy at the National Defence University, Islamabad
Fatima Jinnah Women University, Rawalpindi
National University of Modern Languages, Islamabad
Department of Public Administration, Gomal University, Dera Ismail Khan
Institute of Administrative Sciences, University of the Punjab, Lahore
Department of Public Administration at the University of Karachi
School of Management sciences Quaid-I-Azam University Islamabad
Department of Institute of Social Science at the Bahauddin Zakariya University, Multan
Department of Public Administration, School of Social Sciences and Humanities, NUST University, Islamabad

Philippines
Ateneo School of Government at the Ateneo de Manila University
National College of Public Administration and Governance at University of the Philippines Diliman
UPLB College of Public Affairs - Institute of Development Management and Governance, University of the Philippines Los Baños
College of Public Administration and Development at Western Mindanao State University
Jose Rizal University Graduate School at Jose Rizal University Shaw Blvd. Mandaluyong
Mindanao State University's College of Public Affairs at the Mindanao State University Main Campus
School of Public Affairs and Governance at Silliman University
PUP Graduate School, from 1975 to 2012, now College of Public Administration and Governance effective School Year 2012–2013 at the Polytechnic University of the Philippines
University of Santo Tomas Graduate School at the University of Santo Tomas
College of Public Administration & Governance at the University of Northern Philippines
 Master of Public Administration at the Cebu Technological University
College of Governance and Public Policy at the University of Makati
 Master of Public Administration  at Metro-Dagupan Colleges
Master of Public Administration at Southern Mindanao Colleges Pagadian city

Poland
Białystok School of Public Administration
Poznań University of Economics and Business

Portugal
Universities
Department of Social, Political and Territorial Sciences, University of Aveiro
Faculty of Law, University of Coimbra
School of Social and Political Sciences, University of Lisbon
School of Economics and Management, University of Minho
Polytechnic institutes
School of Communication, Public Management and Tourism, Polytechnic Institute of Bragança
School of Management, Polytechnic Institute of Cávado e do Ave
Institute of Accounting and Administration, Polytechnic Institute of Coimbra
School of Technology and Management, Polytechnic Institute of Leiria
Institute of Accounting and Administration, Polytechnic Institute of Lisboa
Institute of Accounting and Administration, Polytechnic Institute of Porto
School of Technology and Management, University of Aveiro

Russia
Russian Presidential Academy of National Economy and Public Administration

Singapore
Lee Kuan Yew School of Public Policy, National University of Singapore
Nanyang Centre of Public Administration, Nanyang Technological University, Singapore

South Africa
School of Public Management & Administration, University of Pretoria
School of Public Leadership University of Stellenbosch
Faculty of Management and Commerce (Department of Public Administration) University of Fort Hare
College of Economic and Management Sciences University of South Africa

Spain

State 
Instituto Nacional de Administración Pública (INAP), Menéndez Pelayo International University (UIMP)

Catalonia 
 Escola d'Administració Pública de Catalunya

Euskadi 
 Herri Arduralaritzaren Euskal Erakundea - Instituto Vasco de Administraciones Públicas

Galicia 
 Escola Galega de Administración Pública

Navarre 
 Nafarroako Administrazio Publikoaren Institutoa - Instituto Navarro de Administración Pública

Sweden
 School of Public Administration at University of Gothenburg

Switzerland 
 Swiss Graduate School of Public Administration (IDHEAP) at University of Lausanne
 Master in Public Management at University of Geneva
 Center of Competence for Public Management at University of Bern

Taiwan
College of Humanities and Social Sciences, National Dong Hwa University - Master of Public Administration (MPA)

Thailand
National Institute of Development Administration

Turkey
Ankara University Political Science and Public Administration
Istanbul Medipol University Political Science and Public Administration
Yeditepe University Department of Public Administration
Yeditepe University M.A. in Local Government and Governance
Sabancı University Public Policy Program

Uganda

 Bugema University
 Gulu University
 Kabale University
 Makerere University
 Uganda Management Institute

Ukraine
 National Academy of Public Administration, under the President of Ukraine

United Kingdom

England
Institute of Local Government Studies (INLOGOV), University of BirminghamInlogov website
Department of Social Policy and Intervention, University of Oxford
Department of Politics and International Studies University of Cambridge
Department of Leadership and HRM, Newcastle Business School
Blavatnik School of Government, University of Oxford
School of Public Policy, London School of Economics and Political Science 
The Centre for Financial and Management Studies, SOAS, University of London
London South Bank University
University College London
University of Portsmouth
Centre for International Development, University of Bradford
University of York
School of Sociology and Social Policy, University of Nottingham

Scotland
School of Arts, Social Sciences and Management, Queen Margaret University, Edinburgh

United States

Alabama
Auburn University College of Liberal Arts
Auburn University, Montgomery College of Liberal Arts & Social Sciences
Jacksonville State University Political Science & Public Administration
Troy University College of Arts and Sciences
University of Alabama College of Arts and Sciences
University of Alabama at Birmingham Department of Government
University of Alabama in Huntsville College of Liberal Arts
University of South Alabama College of Arts and Sciences

Alaska
University of Alaska Anchorage College of Business and Public Policy
University of Alaska Southeast School of Management

Arizona
Arizona State University ASU School of Public Affairs
Grand Canyon University Ken Blanchard College of Business
Northern Arizona University The College of Social & Behavioral Sciences
University of Arizona College of Social & Behavioral Sciences

Arkansas
Arkansas State University College of Liberal Arts and Communication
Southern Arkansas University College of Liberal and Performing Arts
University of Arkansas J. William Fulbright College of Arts and Sciences
University of Arkansas at Little Rock Institute of Government

California
Brandman University School of Business & Professional Studies
California Lutheran University School of Management
California Polytechnic State University College of Liberal Arts
California State University, Bakersfield School of Business and Public Administration
California State University, Chico The College of Behavioral & Social Sciences
California State University, Dominguez Hills College of Business Administration & Public Policy
California State University, East Bay College of Letters, Arts & Social Sciences
California State University, Fresno Department of Political Science
California State University, Fullerton College of Humanities and Social Sciences; Division of Politics, Administration, and Justice
California State University, Long Beach Graduate Center for Public Policy & Administration
California State University, Los Angeles Department of Political Science
California State University, Northridge Roland Tseng College of Extended Learning
California State University, Sacramento College of Social Sciences and Interdisciplinary Studies
California State University, San Bernardino  College of Business and Public Administration
California State University, Stanislaus College of the Arts, Humanities and Social Sciences
Monterey Institute of International Studies at Middlebury College
National University School of Professional Studies 
Naval Postgraduate School Graduate School of Business and Public Policy
Northcentral University School of Business Administration 
Pepperdine University School of Public Policy
San Diego State University School of Public Affairs
San Francisco State University Department of Public Administration
San Jose State University Department of Political Science
Sonoma State University School of Social Sciences
Stanford University School of Humanities and Sciences
University of California, Berkeley Goldman School
University of California, Irvine School of Social Ecology
University of California, Los Angeles Luskin School of Public Affairs
University of California, Riverside School of Public Policy, as of Fall 2015
University of La Verne College of Business and Public Management
University of the Pacific Pacific McGeorge School of Law
University of San Francisco School of Management
University of Southern California Sol Price School of Public Policy

Colorado
Colorado Christian University  College of Adult and Graduate Studies
University of Colorado Colorado Springs School of Public Affairs
University of Colorado Denver School of Public Affairs
University of Denver Institute for Public Policy Studies

Connecticut
Fairfield University College of Arts & Sciences
Trinity College Department of Public Policy and Law
University of Connecticut Department of Public Policy
University of New Haven Henry C. Lee School of Public Service

Delaware
Delaware State University College of Arts, Humanities and Social Sciences
University of Delaware Joseph R. Biden, Jr. School of Public Policy & Administration

District of Columbia
American University School of Public Affairs
Gallaudet University
The George Washington University Trachtenberg School of Public Policy and Public Administration
Georgetown University McCourt School of Public Policy
Johns Hopkins University

Florida
Frank J. Rooney School of Adult and Continuing Education at Barry University
School of Public Administration at Florida Atlantic University
Division of Public Affairs at Florida Gulf Coast University
Department of Public Administration at Florida International University
Askew School of Public Administration and Policy at Florida State University
Jacksonville University Public Policy Institute
H. Wayne Huizenga School of Business and Entrepreneurship at Nova Southeastern University
University of Central Florida School of Public Administration
Bob Graham Center for Public Service at the University of Florida
University of Miami Master of Public Administration Program
Department of Political Science and Public Administration at the University of North Florida
Public Administration Program at the University of South Florida
Master of Science in Administration at the University of West Florida

Georgia
Albany State University Department of History, Political Science and Public Administration
Augusta University Department of Political Science
Clark Atlanta University Department of Public Administration
Columbus State University Department of Political Science, The Graduate School
Georgia College & State University College of Arts and Sciences
Georgia Institute of Technology School of Public Policy
Georgia Southern University Department of Public and Nonprofit Studies
Georgia State University Andrew Young School of Policy Studies
Kennesaw State University Department of Political Science and International Affairs
Savannah State University Department of Political Science, Public Administration & Urban Studies
University of Georgia Department of Public Administration and Policy
University of West Georgia Department of Political Science
Valdosta State University Department of Political Science

Guam
University of Guam College of Liberal Arts & Social Sciences

Idaho 
Boise State University School of Public Service
University of Idaho College of Letters, Arts and Social Sciences

Illinois 
Aurora University Master of Public Administration
DePaul University School of Public Service
Governors State University
Illinois Institute of Technology
National Louis University Master of Public Administration
Northern Illinois University Division of Public Administration
Northwestern University Master of Public Policy and Administration
Southern Illinois University Carbondale Master of Public Administration
Southern Illinois University Edwardsville, Master of Public Administration
University of Chicago, Harris School of Public Policy Studies
University of Illinois Chicago College of Urban Planning and Public Affairs
University of Illinois Springfield

Indiana
Ball State University
Indiana State University
Indiana University Bloomington
Indiana University–Purdue University Indianapolis
Indiana University South Bend
Indiana Wesleyan University

Iowa
Ashford University
Drake University
University of Northern Iowa
Upper Iowa University

Kansas
University of Kansas School of Public Affairs and Administration
Wichita State University Hugo Wall School

Kentucky
Eastern Kentucky University
Northern Kentucky University
Murray State University
University of Louisville
University of Kentucky
Western Kentucky University

Louisiana
Tulane University School of Professional Advancement
Grambling State University  Department of Political Science & Public Administration
Louisiana State University, E. J. Ourso College of Business, Public Administration Institute
Southern University  Nelson Mandela School of Public Policy and Urban Affairs
University of Louisiana at Monroe
University of New Orleans

Maryland
Bowie State University
Johns Hopkins Institute for Policy Studies
University of Maryland, Baltimore County, School of Public Policy
University of Maryland, College Park, Maryland School of Public Policy
University of Baltimore College of Public Affairs

Massachusetts
Brandeis University Heller School for Social Policy and Management
Clark University, College of Professional and Continuing Education
Harvard University John F. Kennedy School of Government
Northeastern University School of Public Policy and Urban Affairs
Tufts University Department of Urban and Environmental Policy and Planning
University of Massachusetts Amherst Center for Public Policy and Administration
University of Massachusetts Boston John W. McCormack School of Policy and Global Studies
University of Massachusetts Lowell College of Fine Arts, Humanities and Social Sciences
Suffolk University, Sawyer Business School
Bridgewater State University
Framingham State University
Westfield State University

Michigan
Central Michigan University College of Humanities and Social and Behavioral Sciences, Political Science Department
Eastern Michigan University College of Arts and Sciences, Political Science Department
Grand Valley State University School of Public, Nonprofit and Health Administration
Michigan State University, James Madison College
Northern Michigan University
Oakland University, College of Arts and Sciences, Political Science Department
University of Michigan, Gerald R. Ford School of Public Policy
Wayne State University
Western Michigan University, College of Arts and Sciences, School of Public Affairs and Administration

Minnesota
Saint Mary's University of Minnesota Masters in Human Resources Program 
University of Minnesota Hubert H. Humphrey School of Public Affairs
University of St. Thomas Public Policy and Leadership Program
Hamline University (Minnesota) Hamline University School of Business Master's in Public Administration
Capella University Master of Public Administration

Missouri
Missouri State University College of Humanities and Public Affairs
Park University Hauptmann School of Public Affairs
Saint Louis University MPA and PhD Public Policy Analysis
Harry S Truman School of Public Affairs at the University of Missouri
University of Missouri–Kansas City Henry W. Bloch School of Management

Montana
Montana State University 
University of Montana

Nebraska
University of Nebraska at Omaha College of Public Affairs and Community Service

Nevada
University of Nevada at Las Vegas Greenspun College of Urban Affairs
University of Nevada at Reno College of Liberal Arts

New Jersey
Monmouth University Wayne D. McMurray School of Humanities and Social Sciences
Kean University Nathan Weiss Graduate School
Fairleigh Dickinson University School of Public & Global Affairs
Princeton University Princeton School of Public and International Affairs
Seton Hall University Department of Political Science and Public Affairs
Rutgers University Bloustein School of Planning and Public Policy
School of Public Affairs and Administration (Rutgers-Newark)
Rutgers University Public Policy and Administration (Rutgers-Camden) 
Saint Peter's University

New Mexico
New Mexico State University College of Arts and Sciences
New Mexico Highlands University College of Arts and Sciences
University of New Mexico School of Public Administration
University of the Southwest School of Business

New York
Binghamton University
SUNY Brockport Graduate School
Buffalo State College
City University of New York Baruch College
City University of New York City College
City University of New York John Jay College of Criminal Justice
Columbia University School of International and Public Affairs (SIPA)
College of New Rochelle Graduate School
Cornell University Institute for Public Affairs (CIPA)
Excelsior College
Hilbert College 
Long Island University
Milano School of Management, Policy, and Environment
New York University Wagner Graduate School of Public Service
Syracuse University Maxwell School
University at Albany Rockefeller College of Public Affairs and Policy
Pace University
Metropolitan College of New York
Marist College

North Carolina
Appalachian State University College of Arts and Sciences
Duke University Sanford School of Public Policy
East Carolina University Thomas Harriot College of Arts and Sciences
North Carolina Central University College of Arts and Sciences
North Carolina State University School of Public and International Affairs
University of North Carolina at Chapel Hill School of Government
University of North Carolina at Charlotte College of Liberal Arts & Sciences
University of North Carolina at Greensboro College of Arts and Sciences
University of North Carolina at Pembroke College of Arts and Sciences
University of North Carolina at Wilmington College of Arts and Science
Western Carolina University College of Arts and Sciences

North Dakota 

University of North Dakota College of Business & Public Administration

Ohio
University of Dayton Master of Public Administration
Bowling Green State University Master of Public Administration
Cleveland State University Maxine Goodman Levin College of Urban Affairs
Kent State University Masters of Public Administration
Ohio State University John Glenn College of Public Affairs
Ohio University Voinovich School of Leadership and Public Affairs
University of Akron Department of Public Administration and Urban Studies
Wright State University Master of Public Administration

Oklahoma
University of Central Oklahoma Department of Political Science
University of Oklahoma Department of Political Science

Oregon
Oregon State University School of Public Policy
Portland State University Hatfield School of Government
University of Oregon Department of Planning, Public Policy and Management

Pennsylvania
Carnegie Mellon University H. John Heinz III College
Gannon University
Marywood University
Pennsylvania State University at Harrisburg School of Public Affairs
Shippensburg University of Pennsylvania
University of Pennsylvania Fels Institute of Government
University of Pittsburgh Graduate School of Public and International Affairs
Villanova University Department of Public Administration, College of Liberal Arts and Sciences
West Chester University
Widener University

Puerto Rico
University of Puerto Rico Escuela de Ciencias Sociales
University of Puerto Rico, Río Piedras Campus Escuela Graduada de Administración Pública

Rhode Island
Brown University Watson Institute for International and Public Affairs
Roger Williams University School of Justice Studies
University of Rhode Island School of Political Science administered jointly by the University of Rhode Island and Rhode Island College

South Carolina
University of South Carolina Department of Political Science
Clemson University The Strom Thurmond Institute of Government & Public Affairs
 College of Charleston Department of Political Science

Tennessee
East Tennessee State University
Tennessee State University
University of Tennessee
University of Memphis
Vanderbilt University Peabody School of Education and Human Development

Texas
Lamar University
Sam Houston State University Department of Political Science
Stephen F. Austin State University Department of Government
Sul Ross State University Department of Political Science
Texas A&M George Bush School of Government and Public Service
Texas A&M University Corpus Christi Department of Social Science 
Texas State University Department of Political Science
Texas Tech University Department of Political Science
University of Houston
University of North Texas
University of Texas at Arlington School of Urban and Public Affairs
University of Texas at Austin Lyndon B. Johnson School of Public Affairs
University of Texas at Brownsville Master of Public Policy and Management
University of Texas at Dallas School of Economic, Political, and Policy Sciences
University of Texas–Pan American Department of Public Affairs and Securities Studies
University of Texas at San Antonio School of Public Policy
University of Texas at El Paso University College
University of Texas Permian Basin Master of Public Administration 
University of Texas at Tyler College of Arts and Sciences
Wayland Baptist University School of Behavioral and Social Sciences

United States Virgin Islands
University of the Virgin Islands College of Liberal Arts & Social Sciences

Utah
Brigham Young University George W. Romney Institute of Public Management
Southern Utah University
University of Utah Institute of Public and International Affairs, and The Center for Public Policy and Administration

Vermont
Norwich University
University of Vermont

Virginia
Virginia Commonwealth University, L. Douglas Wilder School of Government and Public Affairs
George Mason University School of Public Policy
James Madison University College of Arts and Letters
Liberty University Helms School of Government
Virginia Tech Center for Public Administration and Policy
Old Dominion University Department of Urban Studies and Public Administration
University of Virginia Batten School of Leadership and Public Policy
College of William & Mary The Thomas Jefferson Program in Public Policy

Washington
Central Washington University Master of Science in Public Administration (MsPA)
Eastern Washington University Graduate Program in Public Administration (PADM)
The Evergreen State College Master of Public Administration
Seattle University Master of Public Administration
University of Washington Evans School of Public Policy and Governance

West Virginia
American Public University System
West Virginia University

Wisconsin
University of Wisconsin–Madison Robert M. La Follette School of Public Affairs
University of Wisconsin–Whitewater

Wyoming
University of Wyoming College of Arts and Sciences

References

 
Public administration